Obidowa  is a village in the administrative district of Gmina Nowy Targ, within Nowy Targ County, Lesser Poland Voivodeship, in southern Poland.

The village has an approximate population of 750.

References

Obidowa